Dawa Tamang is a nepalese politician and former  Minister of Youth and Sports   of Government of Nepal .

See also 

 2021 split in Communist Party of Nepal (Maoist Centre)

References 

Government ministers of Nepal
Living people
Nepal Communist Party (NCP) politicians
Year of birth missing (living people)